This is a list of National Basketball Association players whose last names begin with D.

The list also includes players from the American National Basketball League (NBL), the Basketball Association of America (BAA), and the original American Basketball Association (ABA). All of these leagues contributed to the formation of the present-day NBA.

Individuals who played in the NBL prior to its 1949 merger with the BAA are listed in italics, as they are not traditionally listed in the NBA's official player registers.

D

Mike Dabich
Harold Dahl
Ed Dahler
Quintin Dailey
Samuel Dalembert
Howie Dallmar
Erick Dampier
Louie Dampier
Ed Dancker
Bob Dandridge
Antonio Daniels
Dyson Daniels
Erik Daniels
Lloyd Daniels
Marquis Daniels
Mel Daniels
Troy Daniels
Sasha Danilovic
Adrian Dantley
Mike D'Antoni
Pete Darcey
Jimmy Darden
Ollie Darden
Yinka Dare
Jesse Dark
Nate Darling
Rick Darnell
Jimmy Darrow
Luigi Datome
Brad Daugherty
Mack Daughtry
Kornél Dávid
Jermareo Davidson
Bob Davies
Brandon Davies
Anthony Davis
Antonio Davis
Aubrey Davis
Baron Davis
Ben Davis
Bill Davis
Bob Davis
Brad Davis
Brian Davis
Charles Davis
Charlie Davis
Dale Davis
Deyonta Davis
Dwight Davis
Ed Davis
Emanual Davis
Glen Davis
Harry Davis
Hubert Davis
Jim Davis
Johnny Davis (b. 1955)
Johnny Davis (b. 2002)
Josh Davis
Lee Davis
Mark Davis (b. 1963)
Mark Davis (b. 1973)
Mel Davis
Mickey Davis
Mike Davis (b. 1946)
Mike Davis (b. 1956)
Monti Davis
Paul Davis
Ralph Davis
Red Davis
Ricky Davis
Ron Davis
Terence Davis
Terry Davis
Tyler Davis
Walt Davis
Walter Davis
Warren Davis
Willie Davis
JD Davison
Andre Dawkins
Darryl Dawkins
Johnny Dawkins
Paul Dawkins
Branden Dawson
Eric Dawson
Jamie Dawson
Jimmy Dawson
Tony Dawson
Todd Day
Austin Daye
Darren Daye
Darius Days
Greg Deane
Billy DeAngelis
Les Deaton
Rudy Debnar
Dave DeBusschere
Gabriel Deck
Andrew DeClercq
Nando de Colo
Dewayne Dedmon
Don Dee
Archie Dees
Terry Dehere
Pick Dehner
Red Dehnert
Bryce Dejean-Jones
Sam Dekker
Malcolm Delaney
Javin DeLaurier
Bison Dele
Carlos Delfino
Ángel Delgado
Tony Delk
Vinny Del Negro
Matthew Dellavedova
Nate DeLong
Fennis Dembo
Harold Dembo
Larry Demic
Dell Demps
George Dempsey
Luol Deng
Kenny Dennard
Blaine Denning
Justin Dentmon
Randy Denton
Joe DePre
Rod Derline
DeMar DeRozan
Marcus Derrickson
Dave Deutsch
Bill DeVenzio
Corky Devlin
Hal Devoll
Bob DeWeese
Hank DeZonie
Moussa Diabaté
Mamadi Diakite
Derrick Dial
Cheick Diallo
Hamidou Diallo
Boris Diaw
Yakhouba Diawara
Guillermo Diaz
Dan Dickau
Kaniel Dickens
Henry Dickerson
Michael Dickerson
Clyde Dickey
Derrek Dickey
Dick Dickey
John Dickson
Whitey Dienelt
Travis Diener
Gorgui Dieng
Ousmane Dieng
Connie Dierking
Coby Dietrick
Bob Dietz
Ernie DiGregorio
Craig Dill
Dwaine Dillard
Mickey Dillard
Bob Dille
John Dillon
Byron Dinkins
Jackie Dinkins
Harry Dinnel
Bill Dinwiddie
Spencer Dinwiddie
Ike Diogu
DeSagana Diop
Terry Dischinger
Fred Diute
Vlade Divac
Donte DiVincenzo
Juan Dixon
Aleksandar Đorđević
Earl Dodd
Gus Doerner
Michael Doleac
Joe Dolhon
Bob Doll
James Donaldson
Luka Dončić
Bob Donham
Billy Donovan
Harry Donovan
Keyon Dooling
Jacky Dorsey
Joey Dorsey
Ron Dorsey
Tyler Dorsey
Luguentz Dort
Ayo Dosunmu
Damyean Dotson
Devon Dotson
Quincy Douby
Bruce Douglas
John Douglas
Leon Douglas
Sherman Douglas
Toney Douglas
Chris Douglas-Roberts
Sekou Doumbouya
Sonny Dove
Jerry Dover
Zabian Dowdell
Duck Dowell
Bill Downey
Glynn Downey
Steve Downing
Jeff Dowtin
Danny Doyle
Milton Doyle
P. J. Dozier
Terry Dozier
Goran Dragić
Zoran Dragić
Greg Dreiling
Bryce Drew
John Drew
Larry Drew
Larry Drew II
Clyde Drexler
Nate Driggers
Terry Driscoll
John Drish
Bob Dro
Predrag Drobnjak
Ralph Drollinger
Andre Drummond
Beryl Drummond
Chris Duarte
Paul DuCharme
Dick Duckett
Kevin Duckworth
Charles Dudley
Chris Dudley
Jared Dudley
Terry Duerod
Bob Duffy (b. 1922)
Bob Duffy (b. 1940)
Jack Dugger
Chris Duhon
Duje Dukan
David Duke Jr.
Walter Dukes
Joe Dumars
Rich Dumas
Richard Dumas
Tony Dumas
Andy Duncan
Tim Duncan
Mike Dunleavy Jr.
Mike Dunleavy Sr.
Kris Dunn
Pat Dunn
T. R. Dunn
Dave Dupee
Ronald Dupree
Kevin Durant
Jalen Duren
John Duren
Jarrett Durham
Pat Durham
Bill Durkee
Bill Durkin
Devin Durrant
Ken Durrett
Dennis DuVal
Trevon Duval
Jack Dwan
Craig Dykema
Gene Dyker
Bob Dykstra
Jerome Dyson

References
  NBA & ABA Players with Last Names Starting with D @ basketball-reference.com
 NBL Players with Last Names Starting with D @ basketball-reference.com

DB